Wykeham railway station was situated on the North Eastern Railway's Pickering to Seamer branch line.  It served the villages of Wykeham and Ruston in North Yorkshire, England. The station opened to passenger traffic on 1 May 1882, and closed on 5 June 1950.

References

External links
 Wykeham station on navigable 1947 O. S. map

Disused railway stations in the Borough of Scarborough
Former North Eastern Railway (UK) stations
Railway stations in Great Britain opened in 1882
Railway stations in Great Britain closed in 1950